Alexander of Zweibrücken (26 November 1462 – 21 October 1514) was Count Palatine, Duke of Zweibrücken and Count of Veldenz in 1489–1514.

Life
He was the son of Louis I, Count Palatine of Zweibrücken and his wife Johanna of Croÿ.

Alexander's Church is the oldest church in Zweibrücken, a late-Gothic Protestant hall church built from 1493 to 1514 as a gift from Alexander after his return from a pilgrimage to the Holy Land. Its crypt is the burial place of numerous counts/dukes of his house's line.

Family
He was married in 1499 in Zweibrücken to Countess Margarete of Hohenlohe-Neuenstein, daughter of Count Kraft VI of Hohenlohe and Helene of Württemberg. They had the following children:
 Johanna (1499–1537), a nun in Trier.
 Louis II (1502–1532).
 George (1503–1537), a canon in Trier, Strassburg and Cologne.
 Margarete (1509–1522), a nun at Marienberg bei Boppard.
 Rupert (1506–1544).
 Katharina (1510–1542), married before 1 February 1541 to Count Otto IV of Rietberg.

Ancestors

References

External links
 Die Genealogie der Wittelsbacher 

Wittelsbach, Alexander of Pfalz-Zweibrucken
Wittelsbach, Alexander of Pfalz-Zweibrucken
House of Palatinate-Zweibrücken
Wittelsbach, Alexander of Pfalz-Zweibrucken
Counts Palatine of Zweibrücken
Burials at the Alexanderkirche, Zweibrücken